Valentin Hristov may refer to

Valentin Hristov (weightlifter, born 1956), Bulgarian weightlifter
Valentin Hristov (weightlifter, born 1994), Azerbaijani and Bulgarian weightlifter